Henri Queuille (31 March 1884 – 15 June 1970) was a French Radical politician prominent in the Third and Fourth Republics. After World War II, he served three times as Prime Minister.

Governments

First ministry (11 September 1948 – 28 October 1949)
 Henri Queuille – President of the Council and Minister of Finance and Economic Affairs
 André Marie – Vice President of the Council and Minister of Justice
Robert Schuman – Minister of Foreign Affairs
Paul Ramadier – Minister of National Defense
Jules Moch – Minister of the Interior
Robert Lacoste – Minister of Commerce and Industry
Daniel Mayer – Minister of Labour and Social Security
André Colin – Minister of Merchant Marine
Yvon Delbos – Minister of National Education
Robert Bétolaud – Minister of Veterans and War Victims
Pierre Pflimlin – Minister of Agriculture
Paul Coste-Floret – Minister of Overseas France
Christian Pineau – Minister of Public Works, Transport, and Tourism
Pierre Schneiter – Minister of Public Health and Population
Eugène Claudius-Petit – Minister of Reconstruction and Town Planning

Changes:
12 January 1949 – Maurice Petsche succeeds Queuille as Minister of Finance and Economic Affairs.
13 February 1949 – Robert Lecourt succeeds Marie as Vice President of the Council and Minister of Justice.

Second ministry (2 – 12 July 1950)
Henri Queuille – President of the Council and Minister of the Interior
Georges Bidault – Vice President of the Council
Robert Schuman – Minister of Foreign Affairs
René Pleven – Minister of National Defense
Maurice Petsche – Minister of Finance and Economic Affairs
Edgar Faure – Minister of Budget
Jean-Marie Louvel – Minister of Commerce and Industry
Paul Bacon – Minister of Labour and Social Security
René Mayer – Minister of Justice
Lionel de Tinguy du Pouët – Minister of Merchant Marine
André Morice – Minister of National Education
Louis Jacquinot – Minister of Veterans and War Victims
Pierre Pflimlin – Minister of Agriculture
Paul Coste-Floret – Minister of Overseas France
Maurice Bourgès-Maunoury – Minister of Public Works, Transport, and Tourism
Pierre Schneiter – Minister of Public Health and Population
Eugène Claudius-Petit – Minister of Reconstruction and Town Planning
Charles Brune – Minister of Posts
Jean Letourneau – Minister of Information
Paul Giacobbi – Minister of Civil Service and Administrative Reform
Paul Reynaud – Minister of Relations with Partner States and the Far East

Third ministry (10 March – 11 August 1951)
Henri Queuille – President of the Council and Minister of the Interior
Guy Mollet – Vice President of the Council and Minister for the Council of Europe
René Pleven – Vice President of the Council
Georges Bidault – Vice President of the Council
Robert Schuman – Minister of Foreign Affairs
Jules Moch – Minister of National Defense
Maurice Petsche – Minister of Finance and Economic Affairs
Edgar Faure – Minister of Budget
Jean-Marie Louvel – Minister of Commerce and Industry
Paul Bacon – Minister of Labour and Social Security
René Mayer – Minister of Justice
Gaston Defferre – Minister of Merchant Marine
Pierre-Olivier Lapie – Minister of National Education
Louis Jacquinot – Minister of Veterans and War Victims
Pierre Pflimlin – Minister of Agriculture
François Mitterrand – Minister of Overseas France
Antoine Pinay – Minister of Public Works, Transport, and Tourism
Pierre Schneiter – Minister of Public Health and Population
Eugène Claudius-Petit – Minister of Reconstruction and Town Planning
Charles Brune – Minister of Posts
Albert Gazier – Minister of Information
Jean Letourneau – Minister of Relations with Partner States

References

External links
 

1884 births
1970 deaths
People from Corrèze
Politicians from Nouvelle-Aquitaine
Radical Party (France) politicians
Prime Ministers of France
State ministers of France
French Ministers of Health
Transport ministers of France
French Ministers of Posts, Telegraphs, and Telephones
French interior ministers
French Ministers of Finance
French Ministers of Agriculture
Members of the 11th Chamber of Deputies of the French Third Republic
Members of the 12th Chamber of Deputies of the French Third Republic
Members of the 13th Chamber of Deputies of the French Third Republic
Members of the 14th Chamber of Deputies of the French Third Republic
Members of the 15th Chamber of Deputies of the French Third Republic
French Senators of the Third Republic
Senators of Corrèze
Deputies of the 1st National Assembly of the French Fourth Republic
Deputies of the 2nd National Assembly of the French Fourth Republic
Deputies of the 3rd National Assembly of the French Fourth Republic
French military personnel of World War I